is a Japanese professional Nippon Professional Baseball player. He is currently with the Saitama Seibu Lions in Japan's Pacific League.

External links

1981 births
Living people
Baseball people from Gunma Prefecture
North Shore Honu players
Japanese expatriate baseball players in the United States
Nippon Professional Baseball pitchers
Seibu Lions players
Saitama Seibu Lions players